John Morra (born May 25, 1989) is a Canadian professional pool player. Morra has represented Canada at the World Cup of Pool on seven occasions, partnering Jason Klatt in 2011, 2012 and 2015, and Alex Pagulayan in 2013, 2014, 2017 and 2019. Morra is a multiple time champion on the Canadian 9-Ball pool tour. He reached the quarter-finals of the 2010 World Pool Masters. In 2018, Morra switched from playing right handed to left handed due to a shoulder injury.

Titles
 2022 Hex.com Pro Am 10-Ball 
 2021 National Billiards League 10-Ball Championship 
 2021 Southeastern Triple Crown One Pocket 
 2017 Texas Open 9-Ball Championship 
 2016 Super Billiards Expo Players Championship 
 2016 Hard Times 10-Ball Open 
 2016 Texas Open 9-Ball Championship 
 2012 Derby City Classic Bank Pool
 2011 CSI US Bar Table 8-Ball Championship

References

External links

Canadian pool players
1989 births
Living people
20th-century Canadian people
21st-century Canadian people